ORS may refer to:

Airports
 Orcas Island Airport (FAA airport code ORS), San Juan County, Washington, United States
 Orpheus Island Resort Waterport (IATA airport code ORS), Queensland, Australia

Medicine
 Oculo-respiratory syndrome, a usually transient condition following influenza immunization
 Olfactory reference syndrome, a mental disorder concerning body odor
 Oral rehydration solution, a type of fluid replacement used to prevent or treat dehydration
 Ovarian remnant syndrome, a condition caused by residual ovarian tissue after an oophorectomy

Organizations
 Operational Research Society
 Orthopaedic Research Society, a professional, scientific and medical organization

Places
 Ors, a commune in Nord, France
 Ors, Vivaro-Alpine for Oulx, a comune of Turin, Piedmont, Italy

Satellites and rockets
 ORS-1 or USA-231, an American reconnaissance satellite launched in 2011
 ORS-4, the first launch of the rocket SPARK (rocket)
 ORS-5, a satellite launched in 2017

Other uses
 Michigan Office of Retirement Services, United States
 ISO 639:ors or Orang Seletar language, native to Malaysia and Singapore
 Octopole reaction system, a type of Collision/reaction cell
 OID Resolution System, a system for mapping globally unique object identifiers into DNS name zone files; see ISO/IEC JTC 1/SC 6
 Old Red Sandstone, an assemblage of rocks in the North Atlantic region
 Operational Research Section, part of the British Royal Air Force in the Second World War
 Operationally Responsive Space Office, a joint initiative of several agencies within the United States Department of Defense
 Oregon Revised Statutes, the codified body of statutory law governing Oregon, United States
 Orlando Riva Sound (O.R.S.), former German Euro disco group
 Overseas Research Scholarship, an award for foreign country nationals to undertake research in the United Kingdom
 Oxygen reduction system, an active fire protection technique
 On-Rails Shooter, a type of shooter video game.
 Ors in List of legal abbreviations